Hongxing or Hongxingzhen is a town situated in the Mingshan County of Sichuan, China. It is under the jurisdiction of Ya'an prefecture-level city. With an average elevation of 679 metres, it has an average temperature of 15.5 degrees Celsius and average annual rainfall of 1300 mm. Principal activities include corn, wheat, tea, and melon production, pig farming and fishing.

Administrative divisions
The township-level division contains the following villages:

Taiping Village (太坪村) 	
Yuba Village (余坝村) 	
Luowan Village (罗湾村) 	
Baiqiang Village	(白墙村)	
Shangma Village (上马村) 	
Gongdian Village (龚店村) 	
Tianwang Village (天王村)
Huaguang Village (华光村)

References

Township-level divisions of Sichuan